The 21st National Film Awards, presented by Directorate of Film Festivals, the organisation set up by Ministry of Information and Broadcasting, India to felicitate the best of Indian Cinema released in the year 1973. Ceremony took place in October 1974 and awards were given by Prime Minister Indira Gandhi.

Juries 

Prior to 21st National Film Awards, there used to be regional committees at Bombay (Mumbai), Calcutta (Kolkata) and Madras (Chennai), the recommendations of which were then considered by central committee. To avoid this long-winded process, regional committees were discarded.

Two different committees were formed for feature films and short films, headed by Romesh Thapar and S. K. Kooka respectively.

 Jury Members: Feature Films
 Romesh Thapar (Chairperson)Usha BhagatTeji BachchanIsmat ChughtaiM. Yunus DehlviAshis Burman
 Firoze RangoonwallaDina PathakB. V. KaranthT. S. PillaiT. K. MahadevanJ. Swaminathan
 Dileep PadgaonkarSubodh MukherjeeU. Visweswar RawAsim PaulTarun MajumdarAnanta Patnaik
 Illindula Saraswathi DeviM. BhaktavatsalaSai ParanjpyeK. R. K. MenonO. V. Vijayan
 Jury Members: Short Films
 S. K. Kooka (Chairperson)Balwant GargiNalni SoniKomal Kothari

Awards 

Awards were divided into feature films and non-feature films.

President's gold medal for the All India Best Feature Film is now better known as National Film Award for Best Feature Film, whereas President's gold medal for the Best Documentary Film is analogous to today's National Film Award for Best Non-Feature Film. For children's films, Prime Minister's gold medal is now given as National Film Award for Best Children's Film. At the regional level, President's silver medal for Best Feature Film is now given as National Film Award for Best Feature Film in a particular language. Certificate of Merit in all the categories is discontinued over the years.

Lifetime Achievement Award

Feature films 

Feature films were awarded at All India as well as regional level. For 21st National Film Awards, a Malayalam film Nirmalyam won the President's gold medal for the All India Best Feature Film; whereas a Bengali film Ashani Sanket and a Kannada film Kaadu won the maximum number of awards (three). Following were the awards given in each category:

All India Award 

Following were the awards given:

Regional Award 

The awards were given to the best films made in the regional languages of India. For feature films in English, Gujarati, Kashmiri, Meitei, Marathi, Oriya, Punjabi and Telugu language, President's silver medal for Best Feature Film was not given. The producer of the film was awarded with a silver medal and 10,000, the director of the film was awarded with a silver medal and 5,000, and leading actors were awarded with a souvenir.

Non-Feature films 

Following were the awards given:

Short films and Documentaries

Awards not given 

Following were the awards not given as no film was found to be suitable for the award:

 Best Film on Family Welfare
 Best Children's Film
 Lyric Writer of the Best Film Song on National Integration
 Best Female Playback Singer
 Best Animation Film
 President's silver medal for Best Feature Film in English
 President's silver medal for Best Feature Film in Manipuri
 President's silver medal for Best Feature Film in Marathi
 President's silver medal for Best Feature Film in Oriya
 President's silver medal for Best Feature Film in Punjabi
 President's silver medal for Best Feature Film in Telugu

Explanatory notes

References

External links
 National Film Awards Archives
 Official Page for Directorate of Film Festivals, India

National Film Awards (India) ceremonies
1974 film awards
1974 in Indian cinema